Calolisianthus is a genus of flowering plants belonging to the family Gentianaceae.

Its native range is Brazil.

Species:

Calolisianthus amplissimus 
Calolisianthus pedunculatus

References

Gentianaceae
Gentianaceae genera